The 2014–15 Bobsleigh World Cup is a multi race tournament over a season for bobsleigh. The season started on 12 December 2014 in Lake Placid, United States and ended on 15 February 2015 in Sochi, Russia. The World Cup is organised by the FIBT who also run World Cups and Championships in skeleton.

Calendar 
Below is the schedule of the 2014/15 season.

Results

Men's two bob

Men's four bob

Women's two bob

Standings

2-men

4-men

2-woman

References

External links 
 FIBT

Bobsleigh World Cup
2014 in bobsleigh
2015 in bobsleigh